Tiaret district is an Algerian administrative district located in the Province of Tiaret.  Its chief town is located on the eponymous town of Tiaret.

References 

Districts of Tébessa Province